Tau Epsilon Phi, commonly known as TEP or Tep, is an American fraternity with 25 active chapters (including colonies), and 10 official alumni associations chiefly located at universities and colleges on the East Coast. The national headquarters is located in Troy, New York, and the official colors of the organization are lavender and white (although most chapters use purple instead of lavender).

Ideals
The organization's creed asserts its governing ideals as "friendship, chivalry, service." TEP attracts and accepts brothers of all religions and ethnicities who agree to be bound by these ideals. Chapters uphold these ideals through participation in various social, academic, athletic and charity events.

History
The organization was founded on October 10, 1910 by ten Jewish men at Columbia University, as a response to the existence of similar organizations which would not admit Jewish members. The first pledge, Maximillian Nemser, was initiated in 1911 and, in 1912, the first new chapter was founded at New York University. Continued expansion led to the adoption of a national constitution in 1916.

In 1920, the opening of a chapter at McGill University in Canada's then-largest city, Montreal, made ΤΕΦ an international fraternity. The McGill chapter has since been disbanded. The oldest remaining chapter, as of 2015, is the Nu chapter at University of Georgia. Beginning in 1923, the organization has published a nationally distributed magazine, The Plume.

ΤΕΦ began as exclusively Jewish, but began admitting non-Jewish members (predominantly Catholics) in the 1950s. President Dwight D. Eisenhower was inducted as an honorary member during his administration. Washington, D.C. mayor Vincent C. Gray was the first black member of Tau Epsilon Phi and was elected president of his local chapter for two consecutive terms.

In 1986, Sidney Suntag, who served as Executive Secretary from 1946 to 1979, published the book The History of Tau Epsilon Phi: 75 Years of Friendship 1910–1985, recounting the national history of the fraternity.
 	
In September 2010, a group of fraternity members called “TEPs for Justice” filed a civil lawsuit against the national Tau Epsilon Phi organization. The plaintiffs alleged that the national executive director and board of directors had been operating the fraternity for personal financial gain and that they drove chapters away by making unreasonable financial demands on them (the fraternity had shrunk from 42 active chapters in 1999 to just 13 in 2010). They further argued that the executive director failed to hold elections for the position for over 10 years, even though the fraternity's constitution required it biennially. The executive director stated that elections could not take place because none of the chapters were in good standing due to failure to pay dues, and thus there was no one who could legitimately vote. While the judge in the case ordered a new election overseen by an independent party, that order was automatically stayed after the national organization filed for Chapter 7 bankruptcy in January 2011. In May 2011, all allegations were rescinded, the parties settled all outstanding cases and the fraternity agreed to hold new national elections.

After the new national elections, Tau Epsilon Phi went on to continue its operations from a new beginning. The fraternity was now back in the control of the brotherhood of Tau Epsilon Phi and progress was made in its expansions efforts. In 2013 the fraternity established the Alpha Tau colony at Rowan University that became its first chapter since 1996. Following the success of the group the national organization re-established groups at University of Maryland, Rutgers University-New Brunswick and the University of Buffalo. Tau Epsilon Phi has since reorganized its leadership structure and began the process of hiring staff after the 2016 Grand Council term.

In 2018 Tau Epsilon Phi hired a new Executive Director and re-established its staff to its chapters and colonies. Since then,  the fraternity has continued to hold its biennial elections and hired a Chapter Services Consultant and Expansion Consultant. Tau Epsilon Phi is currently focused on expansion efforts to re-establish its presence at its previous campuses where it has had previous history as well as exploring new campus opportunities.

Organization

Grand Chapter
As of October 25, 1997, the Constitution of Tau Epsilon Phi required that a Grand Chapter meeting be held every two years. The Grand Chapter consists of delegates from each local undergraduate and alumni chapter. The Grand Chapter serves as the supreme legislature with sole responsibility for electing the Grand Council. The Grand Chapter, while in session, also serves as TEP’s Board of Directors, authorizing or approving all fraternity business, including any modifications to the Constitution and Statutory Code.

Chapters

Notable alumni

Some notable alumni:

Arts and entertainment:
Jeff Altman – stand-up comedian
Howard Benson – Grammy-winning music producer and multi-instrumentalist
Larry David – actor, writer, comedian, and television producer
David Duchovny – actor, writer and director
Mat Franco – entertainer, magician, winner of Season 09 of America's Got Talent
Benny Goodman – musician and bandleader
Larry King – TV and radio host
Gary Kott – writer and supervising producer of The Cosby Show, Kott worked on the program during its five consecutive years of number one Nielsen ratings.
Harold Rome - Tin Pan Alley and Broadway songwriter
Ed Sabol – filmmaker, founder of NFL Films

Robert Sherman – songwriter
Jerry Springer – TV and radio host
George Stephanopoulos – TV journalist
Marc Turtletaub – movie producer

Joseph Wapner – judge, The People's Court

Sports and athletics:
Red Auerbach – general manager, Boston Celtics
Bryan Clark – professional wrestler
Jared Ross – professional hockey player
Eddie Fogler – college basketball coach
Howie Roseman – general manager, Philadelphia Eagles
Jedd Fisch – offensive coordinator, Michigan Wolverines
Bob Vogel - college and professional football player Ohio State University Buckeyes and Baltimore Colts
Neal Walk - college and professional basketball player University of Florida and various NBA teams

Politics and government:
Omar Bradley – General of the Army and Chairman of the Joint Chiefs of Staff (accepted honorary membership)
Dwight D. Eisenhower – 34th President of the United States (accepted honorary membership)
Kenneth A. Gottlieb, representative in the House of Representatives of Florida
Vincent C. Gray – mayor, Washington, D.C.
Louis Harris – founder, Harris Poll
Irving R. Kaufman – judge, United States Court of Appeals for the Second Circuit
Rick Kriseman - Mayor, St. Petersburg, Florida
Elliott H. Levitas – U.S. Representative, Georgia's 4th congressional district
Marvin Mandel – governor, Maryland
David Saperstein - United States Ambassador-at-Large for International Religious Freedom, the first non-Christian to hold this office.
Melvin Steinberg – fifth Lieutenant Governor of Maryland
Kirill Reznik – state delegate, Maryland House of Delegates
Michael S. Steele – lieutenant governor, Maryland and Chairman, Republican National Committee
Rick Santorum – U.S. Senator, Pennsylvania
Leo M. Gordon – judge, United States Court of International Trade
Robert C. Wright - Pennsylvania State Representative and judge Delaware County Court of Common Pleas

Business, science, and engineering:
Max Abramovitz – architect  
Sir Cary Cooper CBE - Professor and renowned British psychologist, President of the British Academy of Management, President of Chartered Institute of Personnel and Development
Samuel J. LeFrak – chairman, LeFrak Corporation
Jonas Salk – discoverer of polio vaccine
Raymond Kurzweil – author and inventor
Harris Rosen - hotelier, investor, and businessman.  Founder of the Rosen Hotels & Resorts
Bernard Siegel – director, Genetics Policy Institute
Chad Trujillo – astronomer and co-discoverer of 12 trans-Neptunian objects, including Eris
Neil Woodward – American Naval officer and a former NASA astronaut
David S. Salomon, Phd. – Breast Cancer Researcher, Cancer gene discoverer.

Other:
Guy Fulton – Architect
Mike Sager – Bestselling author and award-winning journalist

In Popular Culture
 In the Stephen King short story Strawberry Spring published in the collection Night Shift, a  Fraternity House is the opening setting to the story at fictional New Sharon College.

 Night Moves (1975 film), a 1975 film directed by Arthur Penn and starring Gene Hackman and Diane Warren, Diane Warren's character Paula is seen wearing a Tau Epsilon Phi sweatshirt.

See also
 List of social fraternities and sororities
 List of Jewish fraternities and sororities

References

External links
Official website

 
Historically Jewish fraternities in the United States
North American Interfraternity Conference
Student organizations established in 1910
Student societies in the United States
1910 establishments in New York City